Esteban González may refer to:

 Esteban González (footballer, born 1962), Argentine football striker
 Esteban González Pons (born 1964), Spanish politician
 Esteban González (footballer, born 1978), Argentine football midfielder
 Esteban González (Chilean footballer) (born 1982), Chilean football midfielder
 Esteban González (footballer, born 1991), Uruguayan football right-back